Tsentralny Okrug may refer to:
Central Federal District (Tsentralny federalny okrug), a federal district (okrug) of Russia
Central Administrative Okrug (Tsentralny administrativny okrug), an administrative okrug of Moscow, Russia
Tsentralny Administrative Okrug, Omsk, a division of the city of Omsk, Russia
Tsentralny Administrative Okrug, Tyumen, a division of the city of Tyumen, Russia
Tsentralny Okrug, Krasnodar, a division of the city of Krasnodar, Russia
Tsentralny Okrug, Kursk, a division of the city of Kursk, Russia
Tsentralny Okrug, Nazran, a division of the city of Nazran, Russia